The Solo free routine competition of the 2018 European Aquatics Championships was held on 5 and 7 August 2018.

Results
The preliminary round was held on 5 August at 09:00. The final was started on 7 August at 13:00.

Green denotes finalists

References

Solo free routine